Illingen may refer to:

Illingen, Saarland in the Neunkirchen district, Germany
Illingen, Baden-Württemberg in the Enz district, Germany

See also
Elchesheim-Illingen, a village in Germany